Chris Wright (born 27 September 1986) is an English footballer. He is a goalkeeper and currently plays for Boston Town.

Career

Arsenal
Initially a member of the youth program at Arsenal, his first call-up was in a League Cup quarter-final against Manchester United, for which he was named as one of the substitutes, but didn't play during the match. Wright was released by Arsenal in the summer of 2005.

Later career
Wright was signed by Boston on a free transfer. He spent a season with the Pilgrims, making a solitary league appearance against Bristol Rovers on 15 October 2005 when regular custodian Nathan Abbey was suspended. Wright was released by Boston at the end of the 2005–06 season and joined Bishop's Stortford. He rejoined Boston in July 2007 but left in December of the same year. Wright went on to join a number of non league teams most recently Sleaford Town and Corby Town, whilst playing football. Wright joined Pygott & Crone as a financial advisor. In October 2008, Wright left Boston United, with personal reasons being cited for his release. Following the end of traveling in Australia, Wright opted to re-sign for Boston for a third spell on 3 February 2009, signing for new manager Steve Welsh. He was released at the end of the 2008–09 season and joined local rivals Stamford. In July 2011 he joined former Boston United player Shane Clancy at Boston Town.

Personal life
Chris went to Cann Hall primary school in his hometown of Clacton On Sea, He then went on to study at Colbayns high school. Wright is presently a P.E. teacher and Head of Year at The Thomas Cowley High School in Donington.

External links
 

1986 births
Living people
Sportspeople from Colchester
English footballers
Association football goalkeepers
Arsenal F.C. players
Boston United F.C. players
Bishop's Stortford F.C. players
Sleaford Town F.C. players
Corby Town F.C. players
Stamford A.F.C. players
Boston Town F.C. players
English Football League players